Real Chemistry, formerly known as W2O Group, is a global health innovation company based in San Francisco, California. It was founded by Jim Weiss in 2001 and originally named WeissComm Partners.

Corporate history
Real Chemistry was founded as WeissComm Partners in 2001 by Jim Weiss as a one-person marketing consulting firm, with clients primarily in the healthcare industry. His firm grew quickly until 2008. According to Weiss, less favorable conditions in the healthcare industry led to a series of layoffs.

In response, the following year Weiss acquired creative services firm ODA and social media marketing firm, Common Sense Media Group, in order to diversify his interests and reduce reliance on the healthcare industry. That same year, Weiss re-formed the company under the acronym WCG, consolidating the two acquisitions under a new corporate umbrella. The acquired companies and the firm's revenues continued growing. By 2011 it had annual revenues of $48 million.

In 2012, WCG was re-structured again under a new holding company called W2O Group, which was made up of three companies: WCG, W2O Ventures, and Twist Mktg. The fourth company in the holding group, Brewlife, was formed the following year to focus on startup companies. The holding group had $75 million in annual revenues by 2013 and $82.6 million in 2014. In 2014 and 2015, W2O opened new offices in major U.S. and European cities.

In May 2016, a private-equity firm called Mountaingate Capital made an investment in W2O Group, which funded a series of acquisitions. Seven months after acquiring Fox Communications, W2O Group laid off founder Lynn Fox, who sued alleging gender discrimination.

In June 2019, New Mountain capital acquired an interest in W2O Group for an undisclosed amount. Following the acquisition, the company acquired Elysia Group, Discern Health and 21GRAMS.

The company acquired starpower LLC, an entertainment marketing agency, in 2020. In January 2021, Swoop, Inc., which specializes in pharmaceutical IT, and IPM.ai, a data and analytics company, were both acquired.

In March 2021, W2O Group was rebranded as Real Chemistry, and all subsidiaries were consolidated into the newly unified company. As a result of rapid acquisition activity in 2019, Real Chemistry has grown to employ over 1,500 people in 15 locations worldwide.

In January 2022, Shankar Narayanan took over as CEO, and founder Jim Weiss became chairman.

Acquisitions

Operations and services
Real Chemistry provides marketing and tech-enabled global health services to healthcare and technology companies. The company operated through five subsidiaries: WCG, Twist, Pure, Sentient and Marketeching, but has since unified into Real Chemistry. WCG was the public relations arm. As of 2012, it was responsible for about 80 percent of the company's revenue. Twist is a 50-person division that initially served largely as a conflict and analytics division. The Brewlife division serves the company's startup and emerging technology clientele.

Real Chemistry is the second largest PR firm by revenue in O'Dwyer's annual rankings of U.S. agencies and the largest in the healthcare sector as of 2021. More than 90 percent of its revenues are from U.S.-based clients. Healthcare tends to be its fastest growing practice area and was the firm's focus early on, though more recently the analytics practice has taken a larger role.

According to PR Week, the company's most-used services include "PR, analytics, and its CCX creative unit." It also started a multicultural practice in early 2015. One of Real Chemistry's software services is MDigitalLife, which stores data on the online activity of doctors and patients. It is used by pharmaceutical companies to understand sentiment in the healthcare field.

References

External links

 

Public relations companies of the United States
Companies based in San Francisco
American companies established in 2001
2001 establishments in California
Health care companies of the United States